The 2018 CMT Music Awards were held at Bridgestone Arena in Nashville, Tennessee on June 6, 2018. Little Big Town was the host for the show. The CMT Music Awards are a fan-voted awards show for country music videos and television performances; Voting takes place on CMT's website.

Winners and nominees 
Winners are shown in bold.

References 

2018 music awards
2018 awards in the United States
CMT Music Awards
June 2018 events in the United States
2018 in Tennessee